This is a list of series released by or aired on TVB Jade Channel in 1993.

First line series
These dramas aired in Hong Kong from 7:30 to 8:30 pm, Monday to Friday on TVB.

Second line series
These dramas aired in Hong Kong from 9:00 to 10:00 pm, Monday to Friday on TVB.

Third line series
These dramas aired in Hong Kong from 10:15 to 10:45 pm, Monday to Friday on TVB.

Other series

Warehoused series
These dramas were released overseas and have not broadcast on TVB Jade Channel.

References

External links
 TVB.com Official Website 
 TVB Portal.com  1993 TVB Sales Presentation 

TVB dramas
1993 in Hong Kong television